Fools Highway is a 1924 American silent romantic drama film directed by Irving Cummings and starring Mary Philbin. The film was produced and released by Universal Pictures.

Plot
As described in a film magazine review, Mamie Rose, little mender of the shop of Old Levi, is loved by Mike Kildare, a pugilist and ward heeler of the Bowery of New York City. She repulses his advances, horrified by his business, but still fascinated by the tough man's brute strength and animal attraction. When he discovers that his love for her is a true and holy thing, he forsakes his gang. They then lay a trap for him and Mike ends up horribly beaten in an underground den. Then follows a gripping endowment, in which Mike wins the love of the young woman and joins forces with society against the law breakers of his former days.

Cast

Preservation
With no prints of Fools Highway located in any film archives, it is a lost film.

References

External links

Progressive Silent Film List: Fools’ Highway at silentera.com (with still)

1924 films
Lost American films
Films directed by Irving Cummings
American silent feature films
American black-and-white films
American romantic drama films
1924 romantic drama films
1924 lost films
1920s American films
Silent romantic drama films
Silent American drama films